Kadalai is a 2016 Indian Tamil-language comedy film directed by P. Sagayasuresh, starring Ma Ka Pa Anand and Aishwarya Rajesh. Featuring music composed by C. S. Sam, the film began production in early 2015 and was released on 29 October 2016.

Plot

Cast 

Ma Ka Pa Anand as Manickam
Aishwarya Rajesh as Kalai
Ponvannan as Boopathy
Yogi Babu as Kaali
John Vijay as Businessman
Manobala as Swamy
Yaar Kannan as Ponna
Lollu Sabha Manohar
Raviraj
Thavasi

Production 
The film was announced and began shoot during January 2015 under the title of Deepavali Thuppakki, with Ma Ka Pa Anand and Aishwarya Rajesh selected to play the lead roles.

In July 2016, the film went through a name change from Deepavali Thuppakki to Kadalai, after the film felt the latter reflected the film's theme of agriculture better. The director, Suresh, had also considered the title Nel, but felt that the audience may see it as an art film if they had chosen that. The team experienced further titled trouble after the makers of another film titled Kadala Poda Oru Ponnu Venum complained to the Producers' Council stating that the titles were too similar.

Soundtrack 
The soundtrack was composed by Sam CS.

Critical reception 
The Times of India wrote "Had more effort been put into both the making and the writing, the film could have been called a good attempt, especially given the fact that it talks about the need to promote agriculture among youngsters." Sify wrote "Though director Sagaya Suresh's idea of conveying the importance of farming is laudable, he falls short in convince us with an engaging screenplay in the second half."

References

External links 

2010s Tamil-language films
2016 comedy films
2016 comedy-drama films
2016 directorial debut films
2016 films
Indian comedy-drama films
Films scored by Sam C. S.